"Turn It On" is a single by the British group Level 42, that was released in 1981.

It was the second single to be released from the album Level 42, that reached #57 in the UK charts in August 1981.

Charts

Personnel
Mark King - bass, lead vocals
Mike Lindup - keyboards, backing vocals
Boon Gould - guitars
Phil Gould - drums, backing vocals
Wally Badarou - keyboards

References

1981 singles
Level 42 songs
Songs written by Mark King (musician)
Songs written by Phil Gould (musician)
1981 songs
Polydor Records singles
Songs written by Wally Badarou
Song recordings produced by Mike Vernon (record producer)